Bryan Houghton (1911-1992) was an English Catholic priest. A Traditionalist Catholic, Houghton was opposed to the reforms of Vatican II, on which he wrote many books.

Youth and conversion

Bryan Houghton was born into a wealthy British Anglican family. When he was very young he was sent to a boarding school in France. At the age of nine he had a Catholic friend who became an influence on his life.

Houghton said that in Protestant churches they talk about Jesus and his friend replied: "That's it, it talks about Jesus. They were surely very beautiful. But this is not the Mass. Mass is Jesus". This prospect branded Houghton's life and led him years later to convert to Roman Catholicism. Two years later, he went to Rome to become a priest.

Priest, but isolated

Houghton was ordained on 30 March 1940 and will be for 29 years pastor of two parishes near London: first appointed to Slough in a popular neighborhood, he created the Saint Anthony Parish, and organized a prayerful and fervent community.

In September 1954, he was sent to Bury St Edmunds and as priest takes charge of the parish. There he faced, from the early 1960s, to the action of some Catholic "reformers" whose objective to empty the Catholic religion of its substance, claiming the will of the council. On 29 November 1969, Advent Sunday, he resigned from his pastor charge, refusing to be incorrect to impose liturgical practices. With a personal fortune through inheritance, he decided to settle in the south of France, whose place he knew since his youth. The south beginning where there are olive trees, he settled in the region of Viviers. Houghton purchased a property and a chapel (Our Lady of the Rose) in which, with the permission of the bishop, he will continue to celebrate the Tridentine form of the Roman rite until his death on 19 November 1992. He rests in the cemetery of Viviers (Ardèche).

Committed writer

By the 1960s, he speaks regularly at conferences and in journals by incisive interventions, to give evidence of "conversion by the Mass."

Rooted in fidelity to the Pope and the Old Mass, Father Hougthon was far from following Monsignor Marcel Lefebvre and his first book, The Peace of Monsignor Forester in 1982, marked his distance from the founder of Society of Saint Pius X. This novel contained "liturgical peace proposals," which, if they were not followed by immediate effect, are quite similar to the situation in late 2006. He became a good friend of the Barroux Monastery.

In one of his articles he devoted a book of Cardinal Ratzinger, and Houghton wrote to the cardinal in 1986, saying: "There is no doubt that he has the makings of a great man."

Books

Titles

 1982 The Peace of Monsignor Forester, DMM (Bouère, €20; 244P)
 1984 Marriage of Judith, DMM: exhausted
 1990 Priest Rejected, DMM: exhausted
 1994 Marriage of Judith - New revised edition, DMM (Bouère, €20; 244P)
 2005 Priest Rejected - New revised and extended edition of 27 items, DMM (Bouère 24 €; 320p)

Text

 1979 Mitre and Crook (Catholic Traditionalist Classics)
 1987 Irreligion, DMM (Bouère, F; 44p): exhausted

References

1911 births
1992 deaths
20th-century British writers
Converts to Roman Catholicism from Anglicanism
Roman Catholic writers
20th-century English Roman Catholic priests
Traditionalist Catholic priests
British traditionalist Catholics